Glencairn is a stop on the Luas light-rail tram system in Dún Laoghaire - Rathdown, south of Dublin, Ireland. It opened in 2010 as a stop on the extension of the Green Line south from Sandyford to Brides Glen.

Location and access
The stop is located at the side of Murphystown Way, near Glencairn House, the official residence of the British ambassador to Ireland.

To the south of the stop, the track continues in a reserved section at the side of the road.  To the north, it cuts through an otherwise undeveloped wooded area, crosses the M50 motorway on a bridge, and continues north.

Glencairn is also served by Dublin Bus routes 47 and 118.

References

Luas Green Line stops in Dún Laoghaire–Rathdown
Railway stations opened in 2010
2010 establishments in Ireland
Railway stations in the Republic of Ireland opened in the 21st century